"Hot Girl" is a song by German Dance-Band R.I.O. The song was written by Yann Peifer, Manuel Reuter and Andres Ballinas. It was released in the Netherlands as a digital download on 28 October 2010.

Track listing
Digital download
 "Hot Girl" – 3:36
 "Hot Girl" (Extended Mix) – 5:09
 "Hot Girl" (Wideboys Remix) – 6:50
 "Hot Girl" (Money G Remix) – 5:20
 "Hot Girl" (Soundpusher Remix) – 5:20
 "Hot Girl" (Olav Basoski Remix) – 6:46

Credits and personnel
Lead vocals – Tony T.
Producers – Yann Peifer, Manuel Reuter
Lyrics – Yann Peifer, Manuel Reuter, Andres Ballinas
Label: Spinnin Records

Charts

Release history

References

2010 singles
R.I.O. songs
2010 songs
Songs written by DJ Manian
Songs written by Yanou
Spinnin' Records singles
Songs written by Andres Ballinas